Petr Pavlásek (31 January 1947 – 3 January 2023) was a Czech weightlifter.

Career
Pavlásek competed at the 1972 Summer Olympics (6th place) and the 1976 Summer Olympics (disqualified). He held many national records and titles.

References

1947 births
2023 deaths
Czech male weightlifters
Olympic weightlifters of Czechoslovakia
Weightlifters at the 1972 Summer Olympics
Weightlifters at the 1976 Summer Olympics
Sportspeople from České Budějovice